Oblonsky (masculine), Oblonskaya (feminine) is a Russian-language surname, see "Blonsky" for its etymology. Notable people with this surname include:

 (1924-2010), Russian writer
Shane Oblonsky (born 1985), American kickboxer
Prince Stepan (Stiva) Oblonsky, a character from Anna Karenina
Prince Serge Oblonsky, a character from The Chess Player (1938 film)

See also
Mirosław Obłoński
Obolonsky

Russian-language surnames